The forest shield bug (Oncacontias vittatus) is a species of shield bugs endemic to New Zealand. Forest shield bug nymphs prefer feeding on grasses, while adults will eat a variety of New Zealand plants including "hard-leaved" plants like rimu. O. vittatus was one of the first insects from New Zealand to be described by a European scientist.

Taxonomy 
Oncacontias vittatus, was first described in 1781 by Johan Christian Fabricius as Cimex vittatus. In 1851, C. vittatus was moved to the Acanthosoma genus and was renamed as Acanthosoma vittatum. In 1878, A. vittatum was moved to the Anubis genus and was renamed as Anubis vittatus. In 1903, the species was independently described again as Oncacontias brunneipennis. In 1906, Anubis vittatus was moved into the Oncacontias genus and O. brunneipennis was recognized as a synonym of O. vittatus.

Distribution/habitat 
Oncacontias vittatus, is widespread throughout New Zealand and can be found from lowland to alpine altitudes. Individuals can be found on a variety of habitat types such as native and exotic forest, tussock lands and on riverbanks. O. vittatus occurs throughout the year with adults present from October to January. Adults are collected in leaf litter, moss, under logs and the base of plants. They have been found on a variety of plants including Rimu, Monterey Pine, ferns and Nothofagus trees, however, the sap-sucking nymphs have a more restricted diet being found on grasses.

References

Acanthosomatidae
Hemiptera of New Zealand